The Sabalana Islands (Kepulauan Sabalana) are an Atoll in the Flores Sea in Indonesia, lying just north of the Lesser Sunda Islands, closer to Sumbawa than Sulawesi. They are west of Tanahjampea Island and north-east of the Tengah Islands (Central Islands). Administratively, the atoll belongs to the province of South Sulawesi. The total area, including the large lagoon, is 2694 km², making Sabalana one of the largest atolls by total area. The land area of the largest individual island, Pulau Sabalana, measures about 7 km², followed by Pulau Banawaja with 3 km² and Pulau Sabaru with 1.4 km².

The individual islets are listed, clockwise from the northernmost to the southernmost (the western rim of the atoll is free of islets):
Pulau Djailamu
Pulau Sabaru
Pulau Balobaloang-besar
Pulau Balobaloang-ketjil
Pulau Sumanga
Pulau Makaranangang
Pulau Laija
Pulau Sanane-ketjil
Pulau Sanane-besar
Pulau Sabalana
Pulau Banawaja (easternmost)
Pulau Pamolikang
Pulau Santigiang
Pulau Soroabu
Pulau Meong
Pulau Matalang
Pulau Balalohong
Pulau Manukang
Pulau Sadulangang
Pulau Sarege

External links 

 1:250,000 topographic map (northern part)
 1:250,000 topographic map (southern part)
 1:1000,000 topographic map (International Map of the World)

Archipelagoes of Indonesia
Landforms of South Sulawesi